Precious Hearts Romances Presents: Ang Lalaking Nagmahal Sa Akin is the second offering of the ABS-CBN afternoon program Precious Hearts Romances Presents. The series aired from August 31, 2009 to October 16, 2009 replacing Precious Hearts Romances Presents: Bud Brothers.

Synopsis
The show follows Flor (Toni Gonzaga), who gambles to find a decent job in the city to provide for her mother and two brothers. She ends up working as a chambermaid in a first-class hotel where she meets the gorgeous and womanizing owner Zephy (Derek Ramsay), who will fall in love with her.

Zephy willingly turns his back on his wealth just to be with his beloved, but Flor still has to make the toughest choice in her life----to give a better life for her family or fulfill the desire of her heart.

Cast and characters

Main cast
Toni Gonzaga as Flor Magpantay - a kindhearted and hardworking girl from the province who will work as a hotel chambermaid in the city to provide for her family.
Derek Ramsay as Zephyrus "Zephy" McNally - the handsome owner of the hotel where Flor works. He will learn from Flor that money can’t buy true love

Supporting cast
Carla Humphries as Sophie Mendez
Janus del Prado as  Dominador "Dina" Magpantay
Shamaine Centenera as Cita Magpantay
Franzen Fajardo as Jerrimo Magpantay
Ketchup Eusebio as Jericho Magpantay
DJ Durano as Greg
Beatriz Saw as Helen
Dionne Monsanto as Maya
Crispin Pineda as Konsehal
Tess Antonio
Frances Ignacio as Olga
Carla Martinez as Lorly McNally

Guest cast
Angel Sy as Young Flor
Lou Veloso as Don Felipe
Dianne Medina as Nikki
Nikki Valdez as Vicky
Erwin Aurella as Beauty Pageant Host

See also
List of shows previously aired by ABS-CBN
Precious Hearts Romances Presents

References

ABS-CBN drama series
2009 Philippine television series debuts
2009 Philippine television series endings
Philippine romantic comedy television series
Television shows based on books
Filipino-language television shows
Television shows set in the Philippines